Gerald J. Feehery (born March 9, 1960 in Philadelphia, Pennsylvania) is a former American football offensive lineman in the National Football League.  He attended Cardinal O'Hara High School in Springfield, Pennsylvania.  At Syracuse University he lettered all four years from 1979 through 1982.  He was not drafted in the 1983 NFL Draft but was selected by the New Jersey Generals in the 1983 United States Football League Territorial Draft.  Feehery would play 47 games over six seasons in the NFL as a center and guard for the Philadelphia Eagles and the Kansas City Chiefs.

References

1960 births
Living people
American football centers
American football offensive guards
Syracuse Orange football players
Philadelphia Eagles players
Kansas City Chiefs players
New England Patriots players
Players of American football from Philadelphia
Ed Block Courage Award recipients
Sportspeople from Delaware County, Pennsylvania